The meridian 160° west of Greenwich is a line of longitude that extends from the North Pole across the Arctic Ocean, North America, the Pacific Ocean, the Southern Ocean, and Antarctica to the South Pole.

The 160th meridian west forms a great circle with the 20th meridian east.

It is the western boundary of continuous Class E airspace between 14, 500 feet and 18, 000 feet MSL (Mean Sea Level) over Alaska.

From Pole to Pole
Starting at the North Pole and heading south to the South Pole, the 160th meridian west passes through:

{| class="wikitable plainrowheaders"
! scope="col" width="130" | Co-ordinates
! scope="col" | Country, territory or sea
! scope="col" | Notes
|-
| style="background:#b0e0e6;" | 
! scope="row" style="background:#b0e0e6;" | Arctic Ocean
| style="background:#b0e0e6;" |
|-
| style="background:#b0e0e6;" | 
! scope="row" style="background:#b0e0e6;" | Chukchi Sea
| style="background:#b0e0e6;" |
|-
| 
! scope="row" | 
| Alaska
|-
| style="background:#b0e0e6;" | 
! scope="row" style="background:#b0e0e6;" | Bering Sea
| style="background:#b0e0e6;" | Bristol Bay
|-
| 
! scope="row" | 
| Alaska — Alaska Peninsula
|-valign="top"
| style="background:#b0e0e6;" | 
! scope="row" style="background:#b0e0e6;" | Pacific Ocean
| style="background:#b0e0e6;" | Passing just east of Karpa Island, Alaska,  (at ) Passing just east of Andronica Island, Alaska,  (at )
|-
| 
! scope="row" | 
| Alaska — Nagai Island
|-valign="top"
| style="background:#b0e0e6;" | 
! scope="row" style="background:#b0e0e6;" | Pacific Ocean
| style="background:#b0e0e6;" | Passing just west of the island of Kauai, Hawaii,  (at ) Passing just east of the island of Niihau, Hawaii,  (at ) Passing just east of Jarvis Island,  (at ) Passing just west of Aitutaki island,  (at ) Passing just west of Rarotonga island,  (at )
|-
| style="background:#b0e0e6;" | 
! scope="row" style="background:#b0e0e6;" | Southern Ocean
| style="background:#b0e0e6;" |
|-
| 
! scope="row" | Antarctica
| Ross Dependency, claimed by 
|-
|}

See also
159th meridian west
161st meridian west

References

w160 meridian west